Nelagoney is an unincorporated community and census-designated place (CDP) in Osage County, Oklahoma, United States. It was first listed as a CDP prior to the 2020 census.

The CDP is in eastern Osage County, on a hill overlooking Bird Creek to the north. The west border of the CDP follows Saucy Calf Creek, a north-flowing tributary of Bird Creek, which flows southeast to the Verdigris River northeast of Tulsa.

Demographics

References 

Census-designated places in Osage County, Oklahoma
Census-designated places in Oklahoma